The Inspector General of the Department of the Air Force is responsible for conducting investigations and inspections as directed by the Secretary of the Air Force, Chief of Staff of the United States Air Force, and Chief of Space Operations.  The position was originally established after World War II as The Air Inspector, which was carried over from the United States Army Air Forces.  The current mission of the Inspector General is prescribed by Title 10 (§ 8020) and Title 32 of the United States Code (§ 105) to develop United States Air Force (USAF) and United States Space Force (USSF) policy to assess readiness, discipline and efficiency with a vision to help shape senior leader decisions affecting the readiness of the USAF and USSF to strengthen the nation's defense.

History
In 1943, Junius Jones was designated The Air Inspector of the United States Army Air Forces and when the United States Air Force (USAF) became an independent service in 1947, he retained his position.

In 1948, The Air Inspector was renamed to the Inspector General of the Air Force.

In December 1971, Lt Gen Louis L. Wilson Jr. oversees the activation of the Air Force Inspection and Safety Center (which became the Air Force Inspection Agency in 1991) to provide independent assessments of acquisition, safety, nuclear surety, operations, logistics, support, and healthcare to USAF senior leaders. It also evaluates USAF activities, personnel, and policies, and provides legal and compliance oversight of all Air Force-level Field Operating Agencies and Direct Reporting Units.

In September 1986, as a result of the Goldwater–Nichols Act, the Inspector General moved directly under the Secretary of the Air Force.

In June 2016, the Air Force IG, and its database contractor Lockheed Martin, came under criticism when 100,000 official records dating back to 2004 were lost due to corrupted data.

In 2021, the Inspector General of the Air Force was renamed the Inspector General of the Department of the Air Force.

Organization
The Office of Inspector General of the Department of the Air Force consists of four directorates:
The complaints resolution program investigates complaints and potential cases of fraud, waste, and abuse.
The inspection system program is designed to evaluate different levels of command in the Air Force to accurately assess the effectiveness of key processes, procedures and requirements based on either public law, executive orders, directives and instructions. The Air Force Inspection Agency heads the inspection program and operates under direction of the Air Force Inspector General.
A senior officials inquiry program to conduct inquiries and investigations of complaints and allegations made against senior Air Force officials (particularly generals and senior executive service members).
A special investigations directorate which provides policy, planning, program evaluation, and resources for the Air Force's security and investigative activities along with foreign counterintelligence programs

List of Inspectors General of the Department of the Air Force

See also
 2003 United States Air Force Academy sexual assault scandal
 Office of the Inspector General, U.S. Department of Defense
 Naval Inspector General
 List of Inspectors General of the U.S. Army

References

External links
 
 10 U.S. Code § 8020 - Air Force Inspector General: detail; duties

Air Force
1947 establishments in the United States
United States Air Force appointments